Mentre tutto cambia is the second solo studio album of the Italian singer-songwriter Annalisa, published on 27 March 2012 by Warner Music Italy.

Background 
The album was preceded by the single, Senza riserva, published on 16 March 2012 and certified by the fimi gold for more than 15,000 digital sales. The single has won the "Premio Donne" at "Premio videoclip italiano" 2012.

Tra due minuti è primavera and Per una notte o per sempre were subsequently released as singles.

In 2012, the album received the award Lunezia, for Menzione Speciale per il valore Musical-Letterario (literally as a Special Mention for the value Literary-Musical).

The track Tutto sommato is the soundtrack of the film Dutch, Toscaanse Bruiloft and is also present in its official trailer. In January 2014, the song, in conjunction with the publication of album in the Netherlands by Warner Music Netherlands, is extracted as a single in the Netherlands.

The Dutch iTunes store includes two bonus tracks, the song Non so ballare (from the album Non so ballare) and unreleased bonus track exclusively for the Netherlands, Capirai. The two bonus tracks are also part of the soundtrack of the Dutch movie.

Commercial success 
The album debuted at ninth place in the ranking FIMI Albums chart, the highest position achieved by this album, even after.

In FIMI year-end, the album ranked as the 72nd best-selling album in Italy in 2012.

Track listing 

 Bonus track (iTunes Netherlands)
Digital Download

Charts

Year-end rankings

Mentre tutto cambia Tour 

From 27 July 2012 Annalisa makes its first solo tour, the Mentre tutto cambia Tour. The tour is divided into two parts, the first called pretour summer, starting with the zero date of the same date 27 July in Bellaria in Sala Congressi and comprising 12 stages, took place mainly in squares and ended on 30 September following a Sturno in Piazza Auferio; the second, which began on 27 October and called theatrical fall tour, including the presence of stages and sets the 60s', sees the first two dates Rome and Milan, promoted by the publication of the third single Per una notte o per sempre, the preview of the second version. Both versions are organized by F&P Group and sponsored by Radio Italia. Below are the stages divided into the two parts mentioned.

Date

Setlist 
 Per una notte o per sempre
 Inverno
 Giorno per giorno
 Ottovolante
 Bolle
 Cado giù
 Questo bellissimo gioco
 Non cambiare mai
 Tra due minuti è primavera
 Diamante lei e luce lui
 Senza riserva

Band

References 

2012 albums
Annalisa albums